Barry Turner (born January 7, 1987) is a former American football defensive end. He was signed by the Chicago Bears as an undrafted free agent in 2010. He played college football at Nebraska.

Professional career

Chicago Bears
Turner was signed by the Chicago Bears as an undrafted free agent following the 2010 NFL Draft on April 25, 2010. He was waived during final roster cuts on September 4, but was re-signed to the team's practice squad on September 5. He was promoted to the active roster on October 19. He played in two games for the Bears before he was waived on December 7 to make room for offensive lineman Herman Johnson.

Detroit Lions
Turner was claimed off waivers by the Detroit Lions on December 8, 2010.

References

External links
Detroit Lions bio
Chicago Bears bio
Nebraska Cornhuskers football bio

1987 births
Living people
Players of American football from Nashville, Tennessee
American football defensive ends
Nebraska Cornhuskers football players
Chicago Bears players
Detroit Lions players